Bytoń  is a village in Radziejów County, Kuyavian-Pomeranian Voivodeship, in north-central Poland. It is the seat of the gmina (administrative district) called Gmina Bytoń.

References

Villages in Radziejów County